The eighteenth series of the British semi-reality television programme The Only Way Is Essex was confirmed on 3 June 2015 when it was announced that it had renewed for at least a further six series, taking it up to 21 series. It is the third series to be included in its current contract. The series launched on 17 July 2016 with a special entitled The Only Way is Mallorca. Ahead of the series it was announced that cast member Jake Hall had quit the show having appeared since the fourteenth series. Despite quitting the show at the end of the sixteenth series, Jess Wright made a one-off appearance to support Bobby over the loss of his dog. It was also the first series not to include long-running cast member Lewis Bloor, who quit during the previous series. New cast member Amber Dowding joined the show for this series. Love Island winners Nathan Massey and Cara De La Hoyde also made guest appearances during the ninth episode of the series. This was the final series to include Billie Faiers after it was announced she had quit the show.

Cast

Episodes

{| class="wikitable plainrowheaders" style="width:100%; background:#fff;"
! style="background:#FF5F57;"| Seriesno.
! style="background:#FF5F57;"| Episodeno.
! style="background:#FF5F57;"| Title
! style="background:#FF5F57;"| Original air date
! style="background:#FF5F57;"| Duration
! style="background:#FF5F57;"| UK viewers

|}

Reception

Ratings

References

The Only Way Is Essex
2016 British television seasons
2016 in British television